Nicholas Godsick (born 15 September 2004) is an American tennis player. Godsick has a career-high ATP doubles ranking of No. 459 achieved on October 3, 2022.

Personal life
He is the son of former tennis professional Mary Joe Fernández and her husband, sports agent Tony Godsick. His father started representing Roger Federer before Nicholas was one year old and the families have been close. Nicholas has said he personally views Federer as a friend and a mentor. When practicing with Nick Kyrgios ahead of the 2022 Wimbledon Championships, Godsick noted a change in the Australian's demeanour and focus and predicted success for Kyrgios, who would go on to make it to the final. On being told this story on ESPN commentary, Cliff Drysdale responded "ok so Nico is a genius".

Career

2022: Grand Slam debut
Godsick won the doubles at the 2022 USTA Boys 18s National Championship with his partner Ethan Quinn which earned them a wildcard into the main draw of the 2022 US Open.

Explanatory notes

References

External links

2004 births
Living people
American male tennis players
Tennis people from Ohio
21st-century American people